Padre Faura Street is an east-west street in downtown Manila, Philippines. It carries traffic one-way westbound from Romualdez Street to Roxas Boulevard. Starting at its eastern terminus at Paco Park in Paco district, the street heads west for a short stretch towards the intersection with Taft Avenue where the Manila Science High School is located. Past the intersection, the street traverses the district of Ermita and touches upon a number of important government institutions such as the Supreme Court and Department of Justice, as well as the Philippine General Hospital. Also located along this stretch of Padre Faura are the UP Manila College of Arts and Sciences, Robinsons Place Manila, and a number of hotels and condominiums. The street ends at the intersection with Roxas Boulevard, just across from the United States Embassy.

The street was named after the Jesuit priest Federico Faura, a Spanish director of the Manila Observatory (Observatorio Meteorológico de Manila) that was located along the street. It was formerly called Observatorio Street. The Manila Observatory was located at the former Ateneo Municipal campus along Padre Faura, now replaced by Robinsons Place Manila.

Points of interest

The street is the location of the Supreme Court of the Philippines Building, Department of Justice Building and the Philippine General Hospital. Near the intersection with Roxas Boulevard are several hotels and residential towers such as the 1322 Golden Empire Tower, Citystate Tower Hotel, Grand Riviera Suites, Lotus Garden Hotel Manila, Manila Astral Tower, and Robinsons Adriatico Residences. Paco Park is located on the street's eastern terminus. The Manila Science High School, Ibarra's Garden restaurant, Philippine Airlines Learning Center, and some of the buildings of the University of the Philippines Manila are also located on Padre Faura Street, such as the UP Manila College of Arts and Sciences, UP Manila Learning Resource Center and the UP Manila Oblation Statue.

Intersections

References

Streets in Manila
Ermita